The first International Emmy Kids Awards ceremony, presented by the International Academy of Television Arts and Sciences (IATAS), took place on February 8, 2013 in New York City. The nominations were announced on October 8, 2012.

The award ceremony was created to recognize excellence in children’s television programming that was originally produced and aired outside of the United States.

Ceremony information
Nominations for the first International Emmy Kids Awards ceremony were announced on October 8, 2012 by the International Academy of Television Arts and Sciences (IATAS) during a press conference at MIPCOM in Cannes, France. The winners were announced on February 8, 2013 at a ceremony in New York City. The winning programs came from Argentina, Japan, Norway, and the United Kingdom.

Winners

References

External links 
 International Academy of Television Arts and Sciences website

International Emmy Kids Awards ceremonies
International Emmy Kids Awards
International Emmy Kids Awards
International Emmy Kids Awards
International Emmy Kids Awards
International Emmy Kids Awards